Choqa Chubin (also Romanized as Choqā Chūbīn; also known as Choghā Chūbīn) is a village in Gurani Rural District, Gahvareh District, Dalahu County, Kermanshah Province, Iran. At the 2006 census, its population was 231, in 48 families.

References 

Populated places in Dalahu County